Fireside Bowl (or  Fireside) is a bowling alley and music venue established in the 1940s, located at 2648 W Fullerton Ave in Chicago, Illinois.

History
The building was an ice factory in its early days. In the summer of 1941 renovations began and the owner Hank Sophie converted it into a bowling alley, cashing-in on the bowling craze that began in mid-20th century America.  It started as a twelve lane pin boy bowling alley and thrived throughout the 40s and 50s. In 1956 it was expanded and AMF automatic pinspotters were installed and the remodeled Fireside was expanded by four lanes bringing the total to 16.

Ownership
The Fireside Bowl was owned and operated by Hank Sophie until 1966 when Rich Lapinski and Alec "Mac" McGuire bought the bowling alley from an ailing Hank Sophie. Lapinski and McGuire operated it together until 1971 when Lapinski bought out McGuire. From 1971 until 1990 Lapinski operated it as a thriving bowling alley. As the neighborhood changed and Fireside fell into disrepair Lapinski handed the establishment to his son Jim. The neighborhood was getting rough and business slowed so Fireside began to showcase live music on a part-time basis in 1994.

Music venue
While the bowling lanes were used less and less, music was filling in on more nights. There was still bowling on a few nights, in particular the Bucktown Bowling & Drinking League made up of several nearby taverns Bob Inn, Mickey's, Harp & Shamrock and The web took to the lanes every Monday night as they had been doing for many years. However, music was now the primary focus.  

Gradually, more and more shows were held there until 1999 when the City of Chicago wanted to expand the nearby Haas Park. For the next several years the cloud of eminent domain hung over Fireside, but it continued to host shows promoted by Brian Peterson and Dave Eaves. As time went on and the neighborhood changed neighbors became increasingly more vocal about the live music acts. Then in 2003 the City of Chicago dropped the eminent domain suit and it was decided by the owners and family, with talks to the alderman concerning it continued status that if Fireside was to continue over the long term it needed to get back to its roots of bowling.

Back to bowling
In the Summer of 2004 renovations were made to update things such as automatic scoring, new lanes and equipment and upgrades to the building and its amenities. It restated as a bowling alley without ever closing in the fall of 2004. Since then Fireside has retaken its status as Logan Square's neighborhood bowling alley.

In 2010 the Fireside Bowl started hosting live music again.

Popular culture
Several external scenes from the 1992 film Rapid Fire, featuring Brandon Lee and Powers Boothe prominently show the Fireside. In the film it was used as the headquarters of Boothe's character Det. Mace Ryan and his team.

In 2000, The Fireside earned a mention in the song "Goodbye Forever" by Chicago-based band, the Alkaline Trio. The song appears on the Alkaline Trio's self-titled album, and includes the line "Remember last April when we saw U.S. Maple? / Somehow the singer showed  Fireside exactly how I feel."

The bowling scenes from the 2006 film The Break-Up, featuring Vince Vaughn and Jennifer Aniston, were filmed at the Fireside.

Fireside can be seen in an episode of Fox TV show The Chicago Code entitled "Hog Butcher", which aired on Feb 14, 2011.

Fireside plays host to a scene in NBC's Chicago Fire in the episode entitled "Headlong Toward Disaster", which aired on February 15, 2015.

The Fireside Bowl is the topic of the Allister song "Somewhere on Fullerton" and is also mentioned in a song by The Methadones called "Suddenly Cool". Both are Chicago based bands.

Fireside is featured in several scenes of the 2018 film Widows.

Fireside was seen in NBC's Chicago P.D. in the episode entitled "The Radical Truth", which aired on March 31, 2021.

References

External links
The original bookers of the club
 Fireside Bowl official website
 Fireside Bowl's profile on Citysearch
Information on  Fireside at metromix.com
Archives of The Chicago Shows List, a weekly listing of Chicago music happenings
 Fireside Bowl returns to Logan Square on WBEZ

Music venues in Chicago
Bowling alleys